Plasma Science and Technology is a scientific journal published by the Institute of Plasma Physics, Chinese Academy of Sciences (CAS) and the Chinese Society of Theoretical and Applied Mechanics, hosted by IOP Publishing. It publishes novel experimental and theoretical findings in all fields related to plasma physics. The current editor-in-chief is Yunfeng Liang of the Forschungszentrum Jülich Institute of Energy and Climate Research, Germany.

See also
 Hefei Institutes of Physical Science

References

External links
Journal home page
Institute of Plasma Physics, Chinese Academy of Sciences
Hefei Institutes of Physical Science
Chinese Academy of Sciences

IOP Publishing academic journals
Publications established in 1999
English-language journals
Monthly journals
Plasma science journals
Academic journals associated with learned and professional societies